John Michael Hayes (11 May 1919 – 19 November 2008) was an American screenwriter, who scripted four of Alfred Hitchcock's films in the 1950s.

Early life and education
Hayes was born in Worcester, Massachusetts to John Michael Hayes Sr. and Ellen Mabel Hayes. Hayes Sr. was a tool and die maker but had performed as a song and dance man on the Keith-Orpheum vaudeville circuit earlier in life.

As a child, Hayes missed much of his school career from second grade through fifth grade due to ear infections. During that time away from school, he discovered a love of reading. In junior high school, he became a staff writer on The Spectator, the school newspaper, and at age 16, he wrote for the high school yearbook as well as editing a Boy Scout weekly, The Eagle Trail. His work brought him to the attention of Worcester's Evening Gazette, and Hayes began penning articles about Boy Scout activities for the paper.

Later stints with the Worcester Telegram and a profile in The Christian Science Monitor led to a job with the Associated Press. Working diligently, Hayes managed to amass enough money to attend Massachusetts State College.

Career

Radio
At college, Hayes became interested in radio and won a contest to write radio stories for Crosley Corporation in Cincinnati, Ohio. Following a period in the US Army during World War II, Hayes moved to California and resumed his radio career. In California, Hayes scripted for various radio comedies and dramas, including The Adventures of Sam Spade, Alias Jane Doe, Inner Sanctum Mysteries, My Favorite Husband, Sweeney and March, Twelve Players and Yours Truly, Johnny Dollar.

Films
His success in radio led to an invitation from Universal-International Pictures to write screenplays. His first screen credit was for Redball Express in 1952. Much of Hayes's career was spent writing screenplays for glossy, big-budget melodramas like Torch Song with Joan Crawford, BUtterfield 8 with Elizabeth Taylor, The Carpetbaggers with Carroll Baker, and Where Love Has Gone with Susan Hayward, Mike Connors and Bette Davis. His adaptation of Grace Metalious's steamy bestseller, Peyton Place, earned him an Academy Award nomination.

Hayes collaborated with director Alfred Hitchcock on four films: Rear Window (for which he won an Edgar Award and an Oscar nomination), To Catch a Thief, The Trouble with Harry and The Man Who Knew Too Much. Their first collaboration, Rear Window, is considered by many critics to be one of Hitchcock's best and most thrilling pictures. The Man Who Knew Too Much, a remake of Hitchcock's 1934 film of the same name, became one of the most financially successful films of its year of release.

After several years of retirement, Hayes resurfaced to co-write director Charles Haid's family adventure drama Iron Will, starring Kevin Spacey, in 1994. He taught film writing at Dartmouth College until he retired in 2000.

In 2001, Hayes' collaboration with Alfred Hitchcock was the subject of the book Writing with Hitchcock by Steven DeRosa, which gave a full account of Hayes's four film collaboration with the director. In 2004, Hayes was the recipient of the Writers Guild of America's highest honor, the Screen Laurel Award. Hayes died of natural causes on November 19, 2008, in Hanover, New Hampshire. A movie based upon Writing with Hitchcock is currently in development and a new edition was published in 2011 containing additional material.

Select filmography
Thunder Bay (1953)
Torch Song (1953)
Rear Window (1954)
To Catch a Thief (1955)
The Trouble with Harry (1955)
The Man Who Knew Too Much (1956)
Peyton Place (1957)
The Matchmaker (1958)
But Not for Me (1959)
BUtterfield 8 (1960)
The Children's Hour (1961)
The Chalk Garden (1964)
Harlow (1965)
Nevada Smith (1966)
Judith (1966)
Winter Kill (1974)
Pancho Barnes (1988)
Iron Will (1994)

References

External links

1919 births
2008 deaths
American male screenwriters
Dartmouth College faculty
Edgar Award winners
Writers from Worcester, Massachusetts
United States Army soldiers
United States Army personnel of World War II
Screenwriters from Massachusetts
Screenwriters from New Hampshire
20th-century American male writers
20th-century American screenwriters